Pantacordis pantsa is a moth of the family Autostichidae. It is found in Greece and the Republic of Macedonia.

References

Moths described in 1963
Pantacordis
Moths of Europe